Magnan may refer to:

Magnan (surname)
Magnan, Gers, a commune in Gers department, France
Magnan (river), a river in Alpes-Maritimes department, France
Magnan Lake (Gouin Reservoir), Quebec, Canada